Yousaf Babar (born 10 December 1997) is a Pakistani cricketer. He made his List A debut for Multan in the 2018–19 Quaid-e-Azam One Day Cup on 22 September 2018.

References

External links
 

1997 births
Living people
Pakistani cricketers
Multan cricketers
Place of birth missing (living people)